Court of Appeal of Sri Lanka, commonly known as the Appeal Court, is the second most senior court in the Sri Lankan legal system, with only the Supreme Court of Sri Lanka above it. Established in 1971, under the Court of Appeal Act No. 44 of 1971 the Appeal Court has jurisdiction to hear appeals from the High Court or any lower court, while its own decisions may be additionally appealed to the Supreme Court. The Appeal Court his headed by the President of the Court of Appeal.

Composition
The court consists of the President of the Court of Appeal and not fewer than six and not more than nineteen other Judges, appointed by the President, upon the President's recommendation for such appointment to the palimantry Council is approved by the Council.

Judges who hold office during good behaviour can serve until the retirement age for the judges fixed at 63 years, as per the Constitution.

Dress
Appeal Court judges wear dark purple gowns when attending court. On special ceremonial occasions (such as ceremonial sittings of the Appeal  Court) they would wear dark purple gown, barrister's bands and mantle and a long wig.

Judges of the Court
 Hon. Justice K. Priyantha Fernando - President of the Court of Appeal 
 Hon. Justice Nishshanka Bandula Karunarathna
 Hon. Justice Dr. Ruwan Fernando
 Hon. Justice Devika Abeyratne
 Hon. Justice Sobhitha Rajakaruna
 Hon. Justice Menaka Wijesundera
 Hon. Justice D.N. Samarakoon
 Hon. Justice M. Prasanna Silva
 Hon. Justice M.J.M. Lafar
 Hon. Justice C.P. Keerthisinha
 Hon. Justice Sampath Abeykoon
 Hon. Justice Sampath Wijeratne
 Hon. Justice S.U.B. Karalliyadde
 Hon. Justice R. Gurusinha
 Hon. Justice Dhammika Ganepola
 Hon. Justice K.K.A.V. Swarnadhipathi
 Hon. Justice Mayadunne Corea
 Hon. Justice P. Kumararatnam
 Hon. Justice W.M.N.P. Iddawala
 Hon. Justice T. Sashi Mahendran

References

External links
 Court of Appeal of Sri Lanka website
 Supreme Court of Sri Lanka website
 Database of Supreme Court decisions
 Ministry of Justice, Supreme Court of Sri Lanka

Courts of Sri Lanka
Government of Sri Lanka
Appellate courts
Court of Appeal of Sri Lanka judges